Maucourt is the name or part of the name of the following communes in France:

 Maucourt, Oise, in the Oise department
 Maucourt, Somme, in the Somme department
 Maucourt-sur-Orne, in the Meuse department